Andrew Smith (born May 24, 1991) is an American politician serving in the Minnesota House of Representatives since 2023. A member of the Minnesota Democratic-Farmer-Labor Party (DFL), Smith represents District 25B in southeastern Minnesota, which includes downtown Rochester in Olmsted County.

Early life, education and career 
Smith attended Moody Bible Institute in Chicago, Illinois, earning a bachelor's degree in theology. He then attended Westminster Seminary California for his master's of divinity.

Minnesota House of Representatives 
Smith was first elected to the Minnesota House of Representatives in 2022, following redistricting and the retirement of DFL incumbent Liz Boldon who decided to run for a seat in the Minnesota Senate. Smith serves on the Economic Development Finance and Policy, Health Finance and Policy, Sustainable Infrastructure Policy, and Taxes Committees.

Electoral history

Personal life 
Smith lives in Rochester, Minnesota with his wife, Anna.

References

External links 

Living people
1991 births
Democratic Party members of the Minnesota House of Representatives
21st-century American politicians
Westminster Seminary California alumni
Politicians from Rochester, Minnesota